60S acidic ribosomal protein P0 is a protein that in humans is encoded by the RPLP0 gene.

Ribosomes catalyze protein synthesis and consist of a small 40S subunit and a large 60S subunit. Together these subunits are composed of 4 RNA species and approximately 80 structurally distinct proteins. This gene encodes a ribosomal protein that is a component of the 60S subunit. The protein, which is the functional equivalent of the E. coli L10 ribosomal protein, belongs to the L10P family of ribosomal proteins. It is a neutral phosphoprotein with a C-terminal end that is nearly identical to the C-terminal ends of the acidic ribosomal phosphoproteins P1 and P2. The P0 protein can interact with P1 and P2 to form a pentameric complex consisting of P1 and P2 dimers, and a P0 monomer. The protein is located in the cytoplasm. Transcript variants derived from alternative splicing exist; they encode the same protein. As is typical for genes encoding ribosomal proteins, there are multiple processed pseudogenes of this gene dispersed through the genome.

References

Further reading

Ribosomal proteins